Make in India is an initiative by the Government of India to create and encourage companies to develop, manufacture and assemble products made in India and incentivize dedicated investments into manufacturing. The policy approach was to create a conducive environment for investments, develop a modern and efficient infrastructure, and open up new sectors for foreign capital. The initiative targeted 25 economic sectors for job creation and skill enhancement, and aimed "to transform India into a global design and manufacturing export hub."

"Make in India" had three stated objectives:

 to increase the manufacturing sector's growth rate to 12-14% per annum;
 to create 100 million additional manufacturing jobs in the economy by 2022;
 to ensure that the manufacturing sector's contribution to GDP is increased to 25% by 2022 (later revised to 2025).

As a result, India emerged as the top destination globally in 2015 for foreign direct investment (FDI), surpassing the United States and China, with US$60.1 billion FDI.
As per the current policy, 100% Foreign Direct Investment (FDI) is permitted in all 100 sectors, except for Space industry (74%), defence industry (49%) and Media of India (26%). Japan and India had also announced a  'Japan-India Make-in-India Special Finance Facility" fund to push investment.

In line with the Make in India, individual states too launched their own local initiatives, such as "Make in Odisha", "Tamil Nadu Global Investors Meet", "Vibrant Gujarat", "Happening Haryana", and "Magnetic Maharashtra". India received US$60 billion FDI in FY 2016–17.

The World Bank's 2019 Ease of Doing Business report acknowledges India's jump of 23 positions against its rank of 100 in 2017 to be placed now at 63rd rank among 190 countries. By the end of 2017, India had risen 42 places on Ease of doing business index, 32 places World Economic Forum's Global Competitiveness Index, and 19 notches in the Logistics Performance Index, thanks to recent governmental initiatives, which include converges, synergies and enables other important Government of India schemes, such as Bharatmala, Sagarmala, Dedicated Freight Corridors, Industrial corridors, UDAN-RCS, Bharat Broadband Network, Digital India.

Make in India has not yet achieved its goals. The growth rate of manufacturing averaged 6.9% per annum between 2014–15 and 2019–20. The share of manufacturing dropped from 16.3% of GDP in 2014–15 to 14.3% in 2020–21.

Three capital acquisition proposals worth ₹4,276 crore were cleared for the government's Make-In-India scheme on January 10, 2023

The "Make In India" initiative

Ease of Doing Business
India has jumped to 63rd place out of 190 countries in the world Banks' 2019 Ease of Doing Business Index from 130th in 2016. In February 2017, the government appointed the United Nations Development Programme (UNDP) and the National Productivity Council "to sensitise actual users and get their feedback on various reform measures." As a result, now there is competition among the states of India to improve their current ranking on the ease of doing business index based on the completion percentage scores on 98-point action plan for business reform under Make in India initiative. Currently Andhra Pradesh, Uttar Pradesh, Telangana, Madhya Pradesh, Jammu and Kashmir and Chhattisgarh are top six states (c. Oct 2020).

Ongoing global campaign
The campaign was designed by Wieden+Kennedy, with the launch of a web portal and release of brochures on the 25 sectors, after foreign equity caps, norms and procedures in various sectors were relaxed, including application of manufacturing application made available online and the validity of licenses was increased to three years.

"Zero Defect Zero Effect" slogan was coined by Prime Minister of India, Narendra Modi, to guide the Make in India initiative that produces products with no defects with no adverse environmental and ecological effects.

"Make in India Week" multi-sectoral industrial event at the MMRDA from 13 February 2016 was attended by 2500+ international and 8000+ domestic, foreign government delegations from 68 countries and business teams from 72 countries and all Indian states also held expos. Previously between September 2014 and November 2015, the government received  worth of proposals from companies interested in manufacturing electronics in India.

Revision in Public Procurement Order & GFR
On June 15, 2017, Ministry of Commerce and Industry (India), the nodal ministry revised the Indian public procurement order and general financial rule to incorporate preference to Make In India. Subsequently, all the nodal agencies published their own orders to extended the scope of Make In India in procurement related to their line of products.

Sectors covered

Make in India focuses on the following 25 sectors of the economy:

Automobiles

In April 2017, Kia announced that the company would invest over $1.1 billion to build a car manufacturing plant in Anantapur, Andhra Pradesh. The facility is the company's first manufacturing plant in India. Kia stated that it would hire 3,000 employees for the plant, and it would produce 300,000 cars annually. Construction of the plant began in mid-2017 and has been completed in March 2019. The first vehicles are scheduled to roll off production lines in mid-2019. Kia president Han-Woo Park announced that the first model produced at the plant would be an SUV(sport utility vehicle) specifically designed for the Indian market. Park also added that Kia would invest over $2 billion and create 10,000 jobs in India by 2021.

In March 2016, B.K Modi group announced that it is going to set up an electric bus manufacturing plant near Moradabad, Uttar Pradesh. The investment is through a technological tie-up with BYD.

In July 2017, SAIC Motor announced that it is going to invest ₹2,000 crore ($300 million) to build a car manufacturing plant in Halol, Gujarat.

In mid-2017, European automobile major PSA announced that in a partnership with CK Birla Group, it is going to build a car manufacturing plant in Tamil Nadu at the cost of ₹7,000 crore ($1.03 billion).

Elon Musk has recently reiterated his intent to join Make In India with all electric car manufacturer Tesla commencing partial operations by 2019 and full operations by 2020.

Smart Grade Company will setup a vehicle plant in Jamshedpur

Automobile components

Hitachi announced an auto-component plant in Chennai by 2016 with an increase in their India employees count from 10,000 to 13,000.

Aviation

French drone manufacturer LH Aviation announced a manufacturing plant in India to produce drones.

During Magnetic Maharashtra: Convergence 2018, Thurst Aircraft Pvt Ltd signed a MOU with Govt. of Maharashtra to build an aeroplane manufacturing plant near Palghar district (roughly 140 km north of Mumbai) with an investment of ₹35,000 crore($5.2 billion).

Biotechnology

Chemicals

Construction

In January 2016, Chinese conglomerate Dalian Wanda Group announced that it would construct an industrial, residential and tourism city in Haryana at the cost of ₹68,000 crores ($10 billion). However the project was deadlocked as on 28 April 2017 because the company management was resisting a demand by the Haryana state government for a 26% equity share.

Defence manufacturing 

As part of Prime Minister Narendra Modi's Narendra Modi Atma Nirbhar Bharat Abhiyan (Self Reliant India Campaign), India's ministry of defence last month reserved 26 items that will only be procured from the local suppliers.

Modi government did it by amending clause (3)A of the Defence Procurement Order of 2017.

India and Russia have deepened their Make in India defence manufacturing cooperation by signing agreements for the construction of naval frigates, KA-226T twin-engine utility helicopters (joint venture (JV) to make 60 in Russia and 140 in India), Brahmos cruise missile (JV with 50.5% India and 49.5% Russia). A defence deal was signed during Prime Minister Narendra Modi's visit to Russia in December 2015 which will see the Kamov Ka-226 multi-role helicopter being built in India, was widely seen as the first defence deal to be actually signed under the Make in India campaign. In August 2015, Hindustan Aeronautics Limited (HAL) began talks with Russia's Irkut Corp to transfer technology of 332 components of the Sukhoi Su-30MKI fighter aircraft under the Make in India program. These components, also called line replacement units (LRUs) refer to both critical and non-critical components and fall into four major heads such as Radio and Radar; Electrical & Electronics System; Mechanical System and Instrument System.

Lockheed Martin announced in February 2016 its plans to manufacture F-16 in India, although it did not announce any time frame. In February 2017, Lockheed stated that it intended to manufacture the F-16 Block-70 aircraft with a local partner in India, if the Indian Air Force agreed to purchase the aircraft.

Boeing announced setting up a factory to assemble fighter planes, either the Apache or Chinook defence helicopter in India, as well as the manufacture of F/A-18 Super Hornet.

In May 2018, the Indian Army announced a  ammunition production project to be implemented in phases over a 10-year period. Under the project, 11 private firms will manufacture and supply ammunition for the Army's tanks, rockets, air defence system, artillery guns, infantry combat vehicles, grenade launchers, and other field weapons. The Army noted that the objectives of the program were to cut dependence on foreign imports and to establish an inventory of ammunition that would sufficient to fight a 30-day war.

Defence exports
India confirmed that it will upgrade Myanmar's T-72 tanks, supply DRDO's radars to Armenia, Kamov 226 T multi-utility helicopters to Jordan, indigenously developed lightweight torpedoes to Myanmar (previously sold to Sri Lanka and Vietnam), Astra 70-kilometre range air- to-air missile and 40,000 pieces of a component used in Bofors artillery guns for ₹322 crore to UAE, and manufacture DRDO weapons in Saudi Arabia by 2018 (Dec 2017 update).

Electronic systems

After the launch of this project, 24.8% of smartphones sold in India in the April–June quarter of 2015 were made in India, up from 19.9% the previous quarter. By 2019 that number has jumped to 95%. Mobile manufacturing made the most of Make in India.

Various companies pledged investment in India to begin manufacturing
 Foxconn:  investment over 5 years in research and development and hi-tech semiconductor manufacturing facility in Maharashtra but it backed out from the MOU as it could not acquire the land parcel at the terms it wanted.
 Huawei: new research and development (R&D) campus in Bengaluru with an investment of  million and telecom hardware manufacturing plant in Chennai.
 Motorola Mobility: manufacturing at Sriperumbudur near Chennai run by Flextronics.
 Micromax: 3 new manufacturing units in Rajasthan, Telangana and Andhra Pradesh with  investment.
 Qualcomm: "Design in India" programme to mentor ten Indian hardware companies with the potential to come up with innovative solutions and help them reach global scale.
 Samsung: 10 "MSME-Samsung Technical Schools" and manufacturing of Samsung Z1 in its plant in Noida.
 Spice Group:  mobile phone manufacturing unit in Uttar Pradesh.
 Vivo Mobile India began manufacturing smartphones at a plant in Greater Noida with 2,200 employees.
 Wistron: Taiwanese company to start manufacturing of Blackberry, HTC and Motorola devices at a new factory in Noida.
 Xiaomi: smartphones to be manufactured at a Foxconn-run facility in Sri City made operational by producing Xiaomi Redmi 2 Prime. 
 HMD Global: Finnish company announced in early 2018 that it will start manufacturing all the parts of Nokia phones in Foxconn run facility in Chennai.
 VVDN Technologies: ODM based out of India expanded its manufacturing with additional 10-acre Global Innovation Park in India in line with government's Make in India initiative.

Electrical machinery

Smart Grade Company will setup a solar equipment plant.

Food processing

India is among the largest producers of fruits, vegetables, rice and milk globally with trade surplus in food items export.

Pitha of Odisha, Gushtaba of Kashmir, Chicken Curry of Punjab, Khakhra and Khandvi of Gujarat, Bamboo Steam Fish, Vada and Medhu Vada of Karnataka, Khaja and Inarsa of Bihar, Kebab of Uttar Pradesh and Puran poli of Maharashtra have been selected as traditional regional food to be promoted in the ongoing campaign.

Marine Products Export Development Authority announced the deal to supply shrimp eggs to farmer in India for eventual exports of shrimp from India to other countries.

In Odisha Investor Summit, Poseidon Aquatech announced plans to undertake shrimp farming and processing in the state at the cost of ₹100 crore ($14.7 million).

Noodles manufacturer Indo Nissin Foods Ltd also announced that it intended to invest additional ₹50 crore ($7.3 million) to expand the existing facility in Odisha by 2017.

Exports
In December 2017, India announced it will shortly announce a new agricultural exports policy to promote Indian and organic foods, enhance compliance of phytosanitary international food-safety requirements, development of farm-to-port and farm-to-airport cold chain with focus on 25 farm export clusters.

Information technology and business process management

Leather

Media and entertainment

Mining

During Odisha investor summit, NLC India signed an MOU with government of Odisha to set up a coal mining processing plant at the cost of ₹7,500 crore ($1.1 billion).

NMDC has setup a new large 3MTA integrated steel plant in Nagarnar, Chhattisgarh. .The now demerged company NMDC Steel Limited is a central public sector enterprise with a paid-up capital of Rs. 2,930 crores owned by the Government of India, under the administrative control of the Ministry of Steel.

Oil and gas

In April 2018, Saudi Arabian Oil giant Aramco signed an initial deal with a consortium of Indian refiners to build a $44 billion refinery and petrochemical project on India's west coast. The project will include a 1.2 million-barrels-per-day (bpd) refinery, integrated with petrochemical facilities with a total capacity of 18 million tonnes per year.

Pharmaceuticals

In April 2018, during PM Modi's visit to Sweden, Biopharmaceutical firm AstraZeneca said it will invest around ₹ 590 crore ($90 million) in India over the next five years.

Ports & shipping
ports and shipping is done from India to all places

Railways

 Alstom/GE Transportation: The French and American rolling stock manufacturers announced  locomotive manufacturing factories in Madhepura and Marhaura in Bihar.
 Hyperloop One: The American company working to commercialise Hyperloop, signed a Framework Agreement with government of Maharashtra to begin the development of the route from Mumbai to Pune, starting with an operational demonstration track.
 Vande Bharat Express began operating tests in October 2018. It is a semi-high speed train, 80% domestically sourced.
 Rail Vikas Nigam has setup two large-scale rail coach factories for manufacturing MEMU and Vande Bharat Express in Latur and Sonipat.

Rapid Transit
 CRRC: The Chinese Giant announced in 2016 that it is going to set up a Railway equipment plant in Bavo, Haryana in DMIC with an investment of $69.5 million.

Renewable energy

In February 2018, during Uttar Pradesh investors summit. Avaada Power and ReNew Power announced Solar projects worth ₹ 10,000 crore ($1.4 billion) and ₹8,000 crore ($1.1billion) each.

During Magnetic Maharashtra: Convergence 2018, ReNew Power signed a MOU with government of Maharashtra and announced a solar projects worth $2.17 billion.

In August 2016, NLC India announced that it is going to set up a 500MW Solar Power Plant in Odisha at the cost of ₹3,000 crore ($441 million)

Smart Grade Company will setup a solar power plant.

Roads and highways

Space and astronomy

Thermal power

In May 2017, the Union Cabinet approved the construction of 10 indigenously built Pressurised Heavy Water Reactors (PHWRs). The contracts for the reactors worth an estimated  will be awarded to Indian companies. The construction 10 reactors with a combined nuclear capacity of 7 GW is also expected to create 33,400 direct and indirect jobs.

During Odisha investor summit, NLC India signed an MOU with government of Odisha to set up a 2,000MW Thermal power plant at the cost of ₹15,000 crore($2.2 billion)

Textiles and garments

Tourism

Wellness and Healthcare

Medanta to built 6 new 1000 bed medical hospital in Indore, Sri Ganganagar, Lucknow, Patna, Ranchi and Noida.

Assam Cancer Care Foundation is a joint partnership between the Government of Assam and the Tata Trusts. Tata Trust said that setting up of six cancer hospitals and laying the foundation stone of seven new cancer hospitals has raised Assam in terms of higher level of healthcare and treatment of cancer not experienced by other states of the country. 

International healthcare firm Columbia Asia announced in June 2017, that it will invest over ₹400 crore ($60 million) to set up two new hospitals in India by the end of 2019 as it looks to expand presence in the country.

In Assam investor summit, Indo-UK Institute of Health announced that it will set up a medical city in Guwahati at cost of ₹1600 crore ($231 million).

During Happening Haryana summit, Patanjali group announced that it would set up a Healthcare university and a healthcare centre with an investment of ₹5,000 crore ($735 million).

In April 2015, Patanjali Ayurved announced that it is going to open 10000 Yoga Gym in Haryana to promote wellness, develop positive thinking among youths and immunise them from day-to-day ailments.

References

External links
 

Manufacturing in India
Advertising in India
Entrepreneurship in India
Slogans
Modi administration initiatives
Economic history of India (1947–present)
2014 establishments in India